Aargau is the constituency that represents the canton of Aargau in the National Council. As of the 2019 federal election, the constituency has 429,516 voters who elect 16 National Council members.

History 
The constituency of Aargau was first created in 1848 to represent the canton of Aargau in the National Council. At that time, nine seats in the National Council was allocated to the canton. A National Council election law passed on 21 December 1850 divided the constituency into three: Aargau-Southwest (36th Constituency), Aargau-Central (37th Constituency) and Aargau-North (38th Constituency). The changes were implemented in the 1851 federal election.

After proportional representation was adopted in 1918, the constituency was formed again through a National Council election law on 14 February 1919. It was allocated 12 seats in the National Council in 1919. This increased to 13 seats in 1951, 14 seats in 1971, 15 seats in 1995, and to its current 16 seats in 2015.

National Council members

Elected members

References 

Politics of Aargau
Constituencies established in 1848
Constituencies of Switzerland